Sphragista is a genus of moths in the subfamily Lymantriinae. The genus was erected by Cyril Leslie Collenette in 1934.

Species
Sphragista collenettei Kiriakoff, 1963 Congo
Sphragista kitchingi (Bethune-Baker, 1909) Uganda, north-western Congo
Sphragista quadriguttata (Schultze, 1934) north-western Congo

References

Lymantriinae